Sentech is the signal distributor for the South African broadcasting sector.

Background

Sentech began operations in 1992 as the signal distributor of the South African Broadcasting Corporation (SABC). Sentech's mandate also included providing services to M-Net, Radio 702, Radio Ciskei, Radio Transkei and the Bophuthatswana Broadcasting Corporation.

However, in its Triple Inquiry report that was published in August 1995, the Independent Broadcasting Authority (IBA) recommended that Sentech should be split from the SABC and that Sentech become a public company. This report was approved by the South African Parliament in March 1996 and the Sentech Act to implement these measures was adopted by Parliament in November of the same year.

Sentech now operates as a commercial enterprise owned by the Government of South Africa via the Department of Communications and has its own board of directors.

Main radio/TV sites

See also 
 List of tallest structures in South Africa

References 

Telecommunications companies of South Africa
Companies based in Johannesburg
1992 establishments in South Africa
Telecommunications companies established in 1992